Jonathan Levy is an American author known for his work in the fields of influence and adventure. With the intention of bringing together exceptional people, Levy used his understanding of social interaction to create the Influencers Dinner, a secret dining experience for taste makers, thought leaders and influencers from different industries. Levy's work in human behavior has garnered him a reputation as one of the leading super connectors in America.

Career
Levy's research mostly focuses on what affects decision making. He works out of C Lab collaborating with neuroscientist Moran Cerf, of the Kellogg School of Management. Levy spent years modeling the behavior of people at every level of influence, in order to better understand what causes them to engage and connect. His models for engagement are what led to the creation of the Influencers Dinner. and Inspired Culture: The Salon. Levy's most recent research relates to the dating statistics. His team anonymized over a billion data points, from the dating app Hinge, to discover what leads people to take their online connections and move them into in person relationships.  Levy has spoken at many conferences including TED and Fortune's Brainstorm Health.

The 2AM Principle
On November 8, 2016, Levy's first book, The 2 AM Principle: Discover the Science of Adventure was published by Regan Arts and distributed by Simon & Schuster. The book explores research on what causes people to live exciting lives and how this could be used to let people enjoy their lives more. The book was received positively by media being featured in many major outlets. In the book Levy combines personal stories with research and what he calls the EPIC Model of Adventure, a four-stage process that every adventure goes through. Research ranges from work by Nobel Laureate Daniel Kahneman exploring the Peak–end rule and how it relates to the memory of enjoyment, to risky behavior and its relationship to speed of thinning.

Levy asserts that for an experience to be considered an adventure, it must meet three criteria:
 It is exciting and remarkable;
 Possesses adversity and/or risk;
 Brings about growth;

His book breaks down an adventure into the following 4 stages:

Personal life 
Between 2014 and 2015, Levy was recognized as both one of "New York City's Most Successful Bachelors" by Gotham Magazine and one of the "41 Most Eligible Bachelors" in America by Elle Magazine.

References

External links
Official Website

Year of birth missing (living people)
Living people
American consultants
American male writers
American media personalities